Kaitlin Cotter (born 14 November 2001) is a field hockey player from New Zealand, who plays as a defender.

Personal life
Kaitlin Cotter was born in Hastings and grew up in Napier.

Career

Under-21
Kaitlin Cotter made her debut for the New Zealand U-21 team in 2018 during a test series against Australia in Hastings.

The following year she appeared at a Tri–Nations tournament in Canberra.

Black Sticks
Cotter made her debut for the Black Sticks in 2020 during season three of the FIH Pro League.

Due to travel restrictions during the COVID-19 pandemic, Cotter did not represent the national team again until 2022. She was a member of the squad at the Trans–Tasman Hockey Series in Auckland. Later that year she was named in the national squad for both the FIH World Cup in Terrassa and Amsterdam, as well as the XXII Commonwealth Games in Birmingham.

References

External links
 
 Kaitlin Cotter at the New Zealand Hockey Federation
 
  

2001 births
Living people
New Zealand female field hockey players
Female field hockey midfielders
21st-century New Zealand women
Commonwealth Games competitors for New Zealand
Field hockey players at the 2022 Commonwealth Games